The black-capped white-eye (Zosterops atricapilla) is a small passerine from the family Zosteropidae.

Description
It can reach a length between nine and eleven centimetres and looks slightly similar to the Sangkar white-eye. The back is olive green and the iris is brown. The bill and the feet are coloured black. The voice is characterized by soft twitters.

Distribution
It inhabits mountain forests and alpine meadows in altitudes between 700 and 3000 m on mountains of Sumatra, and Borneo (especially Mount Kinabalu, Gunung Mulu, and Mount Batu Patap).

References

Zosterops
Birds of Sumatra
Birds of Borneo
Birds described in 1879
Fauna of the Borneo montane rain forests